828 Naval Air Squadron was a Royal Navy Fleet Air Arm carrier based squadron formed in September 1940 as a torpedo spotter reconnaissance squadron.  It operated in a number of the theatres of the Second World War, carrying out a number of attacks on enemy targets including the Tirpitz in Norway.

History

Malta and the Mediterranean
The squadron was initially equipped with Fairey Albacores on its formation at RNAS Lee-on-Solent, and then moved to Scotland to operate anti-submarine patrols with RAF Coastal Command.  They embarked aboard  in July 1941 and carried out an attack on Kirkenes, Norway. Five of the squadron's aircraft were lost in the attack. The squadron was then regrouped and sailed to Gibraltar in August aboard . They were then transported to Hal Far, Malta aboard HMS Ark Royal. From there the squadron attacked enemy shipping attempting to transport supplies to the Axis forces in Libya. In March 1942 they and 830 Naval Air Squadron formed the Naval Air Squadron Malta, which went on to attack enemy warships and convoys operating in the Mediterranean.  Re-supply problems, partially alleviated by the Malta Convoys led to the number of operational aircraft being reduced to just two. In December 1942 the remnants of 826 and 830 squadrons were absorbed.

828 and 821 Naval Air Squadrons attacked shipping in May 1943, and provided flare illumination for naval bombardments of Pantellaria. In July, from Hal Far on Malta, 828 squadron's Albacores (torpedo spotter reconnaissance) supported the Allied invasion of Sicily (Operation Husky).  828 then moved to Monastir in Tunisia, where they disbanded in September 1943.  Together 828 and 830 squadrons had sunk 30 enemy ships and damaged another 50.

Tirpitz and the Far East
828 Squadron was re-formed as a torpedo bomber reconnaissance squadron in March 1944. Equipped with 12 Barracuda IIs and from April 1944 were based at HMS Owl for training before joining the 2nd Naval Torpedo Bomber Reconnaissance Wing and joined the Home Fleet aboard  in August that year. They were briefly at RNAS Hatston, before re-boarding HMS Implacable and carrying out attacks on enemy shipping off the Norwegian coast in October.  828 Squadron was re-equipped with 21 Grumman Avenger Is and IIs in January 1945, and then joined HMS Trumpeter. They were back aboard HMS Implacable by March 1945, and sailed with her to Ceylon, subsequently disembarking at Trincomalee in April 1945.  828 Squadron then joined the 8th Carrier Air Group and carried out attacks on Truk and the Japanese mainland. After the Japanese surrender the squadron returned to Nowra on 25 August 1945, and remained there until May 1946.

Notes

References
Wartime history

External links
 828 Squadron (TSR) Albacores: Malta War-Time Diaries 1941–1943 Sgt. Thomas Barker BEM

Military units and formations established in 1940
800 series Fleet Air Arm squadrons